Aylmer Byron Hunt (April 26, 1864 – May 4, 1925) was a Canadian politician.

Born in Bury, Canada East, the son of James Hunt and Jane Stokes, Hunt was educated at the Bury Model School. He was by occupation a trader and lumber merchant. He unsuccessfully contested Compton as the Liberal Party of Quebec candidate for the Legislative Assembly of Quebec in the general elections of 1900. He was first elected to the House of Commons of Canada for Compton in the general elections of 1904. He was unseated on petition but elected again in the by-election that followed. He was re-elected in 1908 but was defeated in 1911. A Liberal, he was elected again in 1917 and 1921.

References
 
 The Canadian Parliament; biographical sketches and photo-engravures of the senators and members of the House of Commons of Canada. Being the tenth Parliament, elected November 3, 1904

1864 births
1925 deaths
Liberal Party of Canada MPs
Members of the House of Commons of Canada from Quebec